Wolke Alma Hegenbarth (born 6 May 1980, Meerbusch) is a German actress, best known for starring in the sitcom Mein Leben & Ich. She is related to illustrator Hannes Hegen (born Johannes Hegenbarth) and the painter Josef Hegenbarth.

Personal life
Wolke Hegenbarth was born on 6 May 1980 in the German town of Meerbusch, North Rhine-Westphalia. Her uncommon first name, Wolke (German for "cloud"), was her father's wish, who fought successfully in court to name her this way. Hegenbarth herself says that 20% of her prominence probably results from this name. At the age of four, she started with ballet lessons. She finished her Abitur in 1999. In 2002, she married South African Justin Bryan, whom she met on an internship in 1999, and whom she divorced in 2012.

Acting career
She was discovered in 1995 for the popular German sitcom Die Camper, which launched her acting career, after involuntarily attending screen tests. Hegenbarth herself says that she did not want to become an actress, but, rather, a make-up artist. After her role in Die Camper, she played a number of roles in other TV series. In 1996, she was first offered the starring role in the RTL sitcom Mein Leben & Ich (2001–2007), where she played an individualist teenager struggling in a world of unindividualistic teens. In 2004, she won the German Comedy Award for her role in Mein Leben & Ich. After the end of Mein Leben & Ich, she mainly starred in TV films.

She was a candidate on Let's Dance, with former professional dancer Oliver Seefeldt as her partner, in 2006. On 30 June 2007, she and Seefeldt won the German Eurovision Dance Contest-preliminaries, and they entered the 2007 contest together, reaching the 8th place.

Other activism
Hegenbarth is a sponsor for two children for World Vision, and supports the campaign "Trotz AIDS".

Filmography

Films 

 1997: Freundinnen & andere Monster
 1998: Ich liebe meine Familie, ehrlich
 1998: OA jagt Oberärztin
 2003: Die Schönste aus Bitterfeld
 2004: Crazy Race 2
 2004: Playa del Futuro
 2005: Tote Hose – Kann nicht, gibt's nicht
 2005: Ein Hund, zwei Koffer und die ganz große Liebe
 2007: Der Prinz von nebenan
 2008: Liebesticket nach Hause
 2008: Ich steig' Dir aufs Dach, Liebling
 2009: Im Brautkleid durch Afrika
 2011: Indisch für Anfänger
 2013: Sex´and´Zaziki – Landliebe

TV series 

 1997: Die Camper
 1998: Schlosshotel Orth (episode: "Neue Aufgaben")
 1999: Die Anrheiner (3 episodes)
 2000: Drehkreuz Airport (episode: "Quarantäne")
 2000–2001: Polizeiruf 110 (3 episodes)
 2001: Der Alte (episode: "Mord auf Bestellung")
 2001–2007: Mein Leben & Ich
 2002: Cologne P.D. (episode: "Oliver W. - Tod eines Schülers")
 2003: SOKO 5113 (episode: "Eine feine Gesellschaft")
 2004: Tramitz and Friends
 2006: Die ProSieben Märchenstunde (episode: "Der gestiefelte Kater")
 2010: Notruf Hafenkante (9 episodes)
 2010: Alarm für Cobra 11 (1 episode)
 2010: Eine Möhre für Zwei (26 episodes)
 2011: Indisch für Anfäger
 2012: Es kommt noch dicker
 2012-2017: Heiter bis tödlich - Alles Klara  (48 episodes)
 2014: Boomerang Märchenstunde
 2017: Stuttgart Homicide, Episode Ein Alibi zu viel

Other 
 2010: Die Schöne und der Hai (documentation for Arte)

References

External links 

 

1980 births
Living people
German television actresses
People from Rhein-Kreis Neuss
German film actresses
20th-century German actresses
21st-century German actresses
Recipients of the Medal of the Order of Merit of the Federal Republic of Germany